LFA may refer to:

Organizations
 La France Audacieuse, political party in France
Lake Forest Academy, a school in the US
 Lebanese Football Association
 Leinster Football Association, Ireland
 Liberia Football Association
 Liga de Fútbol Americano Profesional, the top American football league in Mexico
 Liga Futbolu Amerykańskiego, the top American football league in Poland
 Little Flower Academy, a school in Canada
 Local franchise authority, a US local government organization
 Lolland-Falster Alliancen, former name of a Danish football club
 London Football Association
 Lupus Foundation of America
 Lycée Franco-Allemand
 Lycée Français d'Agadir
 Lycée Français d'Amman
 Legacy Fighting Alliance, a US-based mixed martial arts organization

Science and technology
 Laser flash analysis, a technique for measurement of thermal diffusivity
 Lateral flow assay, the principle behind immunochromatographic rapid tests
 Low-functioning autism, a classification of autism
 Lunar Flag Assembly
 Lymphocyte function-associated antigen (disambiguation), (LFA-1, 2, and 3) several cell adhesion molecules

Other uses
 Lexus LFA, a two-seat sports car
 Logical framework approach
 Luftfahrtforschungsanstalt (Aeronautical Research Institute), a secret German facility for airframe, aeroengine, and aircraft weapons testing during the Second World War
 Langfang railway station, China Railway pinyin code LFA